The Carpenter Special, also called Little Dea Dea, is an early homebuilt biplane design.

Design and development
The Carpenter Special was a custom homebuilt design from Wilbur Staib, built for M. Carpenter in Joplin, Missouri in 1933.

The Carpenter Special is an open cockpit biplane with conventional landing gear. The fuselage is made of welded steel tube and the wings use wooden spars and wing ribs, all with fabric covering.

Specifications (Carpenter Special)

References

Homebuilt aircraft